

Points table

Source:prokabaddi.com
 five points for every win
 three points each if draw 
 one point if a team lose by seven or fewer than seven points
 top four teams qualify to playoffs

References

Patna Pirates